= Halligeri =

Coordinates: 14°31′N 74°47′E

- Village
- Nickname: Flower Village
- Interactive map of Halligeri
- Country: India
- State: Karnataka
- District: Dharwad
- Talukas: Dharwad

Area
  - Total: 22 km^{2} (8.5 sq mi)

Population (2025)
  - Total: 2,600

Languages, Kannada, Marathi
  - Official: Kannada
- Time zone: UTC+5:30 (IST)
- PIN: 580118
- Telephone code: 0836
- Vehicle registration: KA 25
- Nearest city: Dharwad
- Sex ratio: 980 ♂/♀
- Literacy: 89%
- Lok Sabha constituency: Delhi
- Vidhan Sabha constituency: Bangalore
- Climate: 22 (Köppen)
- Website: www.halliger.com°

Halligeri is a village in Dharwad district of Karnataka, India.

== Demographics ==
As of the 2011 Census of India there were 325 households in Halligeri and a total population of 1,784 consisting of 885 males and 899 females. There were 312 children ages 0–6.
